Tainted Dreams is a soap opera that premiered on YouTube on December 30, 2013 and later moved exclusively to Amazon and Amazon Prime. The series debuted on Popstar! TV and the Popstar! App on September 23, 2019. Created by Sonia Blangiardo, it is a "soap-within-a-soap" which follows the backstage drama of the fictional soap opera Painted Dreams.

Tainted Dreams was nominated for a Daytime Emmy Award for Outstanding New Approaches Drama Series in 2014, and one for Outstanding Digital Daytime Drama Series in 2017. Kelley Menighan Hensley, Michael Lowry, Natalia Livingston, and Anthony Wilkinson were also nominated for Daytime Emmys in 2017 for their performances.

Cast
 Alicia Minshew as Angelica Caruso
 Michael Lowry as Jordan Bradford
 Walt Willey as Gregory Ashford
 Kelley Menighan Hensley as Veronica Ashford
 Terri Ivens as Kassandra Bently
 Austin Peck as Max Hillstone
 Grant Aleksander as Adam Clark
 Natalia Livingston as Liza Park
 Ilene Kristen as Vivian Park
 Jessie Godderz as Dylan Buckwald
 Bobbie Eakes as Courtney Parish
 James DePaiva as Eddy Parish
 Marnie Schulenburg as Peyton Adams
 Anthony J. Wilkinson as Anthony DiGiacomo
 Dina Cantin as Alessandra DiGiacomo
 Colleen Zenk as Sofia DiGiacomo
 Nathan Purdee as Ethan Washington
 Larkin Malloy as Henry Steinman
 Tonja Walker as Tina Scott
 Lisa Marie Varon as Carla Santiago
 Carolyn Hinsey as herself

Production and broadcast
Blangiardo created Tainted Dreams after the cancellation of the long running daytime soap opera One Life to Live, where she was a producer. She said in 2013, "I was struck by the loss of this unique art form that had been such an integral part of NYC for decades. I wanted to somehow capture my own two decades working behind the scenes of three different NYC-based soaps."

First cast were Minshew, Lowry, Willey, Hensley and Schulenburg. In January 2013, Cantin of Bravo's The Real Housewives of New Jersey was cast as Alessandra DiGiacomo, a role written with her in mind. Later cast additions in 2013 included Peck, Zenk, Aleksander, Livingston, Malloy, Eakes, and DePaiva, Kristen and Walker.

The first three episodes of Tainted Dreams were released on YouTube on December 30, 2013.

Tainted Dreams was licensed to Amazon.com for streaming through its Amazon Prime service starting December 26, 2016.

The series debuted on Popstar! TV and the Popstar! App on September 23, 2019.

Reception and awards
Writing for Entertainment Weekly, Alina Adams named the series one of  the "4 best soap operas on the web" in 2015.

External links

References

2010s American drama television series
2013 web series debuts
2010s American LGBT-related drama television series
American LGBT-related web series
American drama web series
Internet soap operas
Metafictional television series
Television series about show business
Television series about television
Television shows filmed in New York (state)
Television shows set in New York City